Kvärlöv is a locality situated in Landskrona Municipality, Skåne County, Sweden with 226 inhabitants in 2010.

References 

Populated places in Landskrona Municipality
Populated places in Skåne County